Mrs. Fletcher is an American comedy miniseries based on the 2017 novel of the same name written by Tom Perrotta. The series stars Kathryn Hahn and was given a series order by HBO. The pilot was written by Perrotta and directed by Nicole Holofcener.

On August 16, 2019, it was announced that the series would premiere on October 27, 2019. In advance of its broadcast premiere, several episodes of the series received a preview screening in the Primetime program of the 2019 Toronto International Film Festival.

Premise
Mrs. Fletcher is a coming of age story of Mrs. Eve Fletcher (Hahn) and her son Brendan (White). Eve is a divorcée and is undergoing a mid-life crisis. She decides she no longer wants to be her old self when her son Brendan goes to college as a freshman. She experiences sexual reawakening and sexual fulfillment that eluded her in her younger years by bonding with a younger man and his friends. Brendan also undergoes his own sexual troubles as he navigates the complexities of college life.

Cast and characters

Main
 Kathryn Hahn as Eve Fletcher (née Mackie), a divorcee in her mid 40s with an unsatisfying job as the manager of a senior center. The departure of her son for college prompts her to undergo a sexual and personal transformation
 Jackson White as Brendan Fletcher, Eve's college-age son
 Owen Teague as Julian, Brendan's high school classmate, later a classmate in Eve's creative writing course. He and Eve develop a semi-romantic relationship
 Cameron Boyce as Zach, Brendan's college roommate
 Domenick Lombardozzi as George, Roy's adult son
 Jen Richards as Margo, a transgender woman who teaches a college-level creative writing course Eve enrolls in
 Ifádansi Rashad as Curtis, a classmate in Eve's creating writing course
 Katie Kershaw as Amanda Olney, Eve's coworker and friend

Recurring
 Casey Wilson as Jane, Eve's close friend
 Jasmine Cephas Jones as Chloe
 Bill Raymond as Roy Rafferty, an elderly resident of Eve's nursing home with a sex addiction
 Josh Hamilton as Ted Fletcher, Eve's ex-husband and Brendan's father

Episodes

Reception

On review aggregator Rotten Tomatoes, the series holds an approval rating of 82% based on 50 reviews, with an average rating of 7.23/10. The website's critical consensus reads, "Mrs. Fletcher is an empathetic and poignant—if at times incomplete—character study that proves the perfect showcase for the luminous Kathryn Hahn." On Metacritic, it has a weighted average score of 72 out of 100, based on 20 critics, indicating "generally favorable reviews".

References

External links

2010s American comedy television miniseries
2010s American drama television miniseries
2019 American television series debuts
2019 American television series endings
English-language television shows
HBO original programming
Midlife crisis in television
Sexuality in television
Television shows based on American novels
Transgender-related television shows